Edgar Thomas (2 November 1875 – 20 March 1936) was an English cricketer. He played for Gloucestershire between 1895 and 1907.

References

1875 births
1936 deaths
English cricketers
Gloucestershire cricketers
Cricketers from Bristol